Peter David Craze (27 August 1946 – 30 December 2020) was a British actor, brother of fellow actor Michael Craze. 

He made many television appearances, including Doctor Who (The Space Museum, The War Games and Nightmare of Eden), EastEnders and Blake's 7, and appeared in films such as The Beast in the Cellar (1970), Terror (1978) and Hitler's SS: Portrait in Evil (1985).

He was principal of Drama Studio London until 2012.

Craze directed The Trials of Oscar Wilde, which toured the UK in 2014 and was co-authored by Merlin Holland, Oscar Wilde's grandson. Craze also narrated the first season of the hit children's animated fantasy television series The Dreamstone.

He died on 30 December 2020, at the age of 74.

Filmography

References

External links

Interview with Peter Craze, Entertainment Focus.

1946 births
2020 deaths
British male soap opera actors